James Thomas Hogan (1 December 1874 – 1 January 1953) was an Independent Member of Parliament for two electorates in the North Island of New Zealand.

Born in Wanganui, Hogan was a machinist in the railway workshops, and a trade union secretary.

Member of Parliament

Hogan represented the Wanganui electorate in the House of Representatives for six years from 1905 to 1911 as an Independent Liberal–Labour member. Later, he returned to Parliament as an MP for Rangitikei between 1928 and 1931.

In 1935, he was awarded the King George V Silver Jubilee Medal.

References

Further reading

1874 births
1953 deaths
Independent MPs of New Zealand
New Zealand trade unionists
People from Whanganui
New Zealand MPs for North Island electorates
Members of the New Zealand House of Representatives
Unsuccessful candidates in the 1911 New Zealand general election
Unsuccessful candidates in the 1931 New Zealand general election
Unsuccessful candidates in the 1935 New Zealand general election